Vievo is a  village in the Rhodope Mountains in the Smolyan Province of Bulgaria.

History 
During the First Balkan War, the village was set on fire by the local Bulgarian militia to ethnically cleanse the Muslim population from the region. The remaining population took refuge in the  nearby town of Chepelare. Most of the old inhabitants died in this town during the winter of 1913. Later former Vievo inhabitants again settled  in the village and then dispersed  to smaller valleys, tending to settle in a couple of houses clustering together. Some of the names are Chakalovo, Planina, and Livada.

Vievo was subject to the Communist regime's name change campaign during the 1970s and its huge wooden mosque was torn down by the communists in 1973.

See also
 The Destruction of Thracian Bulgarians in 1913
 Second Balkan War

Notes

External links
 Quick facts about Vievo
 The Pomaks
 A Brief History of Ethnic Cleansing

Villages in Smolyan Province